Tur is a character in the Persian epic Shahnameh. He is the second son of the legendary Iranian king Fereydun and brother of both Salm and Iraj. His name, meaning "brave", was given to him by his father when the young prince bravely fights the dragon that had attacked him and his brothers. When Fereydun divides his empire among his sons, he gives Turkistan and China to his second son Tur. This is the beginning of the nation of Turan, the neighbor and rival of the Iranians. Some of the most important characters of Shahnameh, such as Afrasiab, are his descendants. He was killed by Manuchehr.

Family tree

See also
 Turan
 Aniran

External links
A king's book of kings: the Shah-nameh of Shah Tahmasp, an exhibition catalog from The Metropolitan Museum of Art (fully available online as PDF), which contains material on Tur

Pishdadian dynasty
Mythological princes